Kumbakonam Ramabadran Ramasamy (14 April 1914 – 5 August 1971), also known by his initials KRR, was an Indian actor and singer who worked mainly in Tamil theatre and cinema. He was born in Kumbakonam and was active during the early days of Tamil cinema. He was also the first actor who also dwelled into politics mainly with Dravidar Kazhagam and later with DMK, thus setting a trend for many other to follow.

Early life 
K. R. Ramasamy was born on 14 April 1914, as the third child of Ramabadra Chettiar and Kuppammal at Ammachatiram near Kumbakonam. He ceased formal education after the fourth grade due to lack of interest, and started taking formal musical training from the Carnatic musician Kumbakonam Rajamanickam Pillai.

Personal life 
Ramasamy married Kalyani, his co-star in various plays, and the couple had two children. Ramasamy died of cancer on 5 August 1971.

Filmography

Discography

References

Bibliography

External links 

1914 births
1971 deaths
Actors in Tamil theatre
Deaths from cancer in India
Indian male film actors
Male actors in Tamil cinema
Tamil male actors